2X4 is a collection of concert recordings by the German group Einstürzende Neubauten. ROIR released 2X4 in 1984 in cassette-only format (as was the case for all early ROIR releases).  The live tracks were recorded in various European cities between 1980 and 1983.  Kurt Loder wrote the liner notes.  The album was re-released on CD in 1997.

The title refers to the four tracks on each side of the cassette (or possibly to  dimensional lumber, which the band was likely to use as a part of its instrumentation).

Track listing

Personnel 
Einstürzende Neubauten
Blixa Bargeld
F.M. Einheit
N.U. Unruh
Mark Chung
Alexander Hacke (also known as Alexander V. Borsig)

References 

Einstürzende Neubauten live albums
1984 live albums
ROIR live albums